Elīna Dikaioulaku ( Babkina, born 24 April 1989) 
is a Latvian women's basketball player currently playing for Elitzur Ramla and Latvia women's national basketball team.

Dikaioulaku was already offered a deal with Russian Superleague team UMMC Ekaterinburg at age 16. She was a member of TTT Riga until April 2008, when the team fired her. In September she signed a contract with SK Cēsis. Babkina played in the 2008 Summer Olympics.

She was involved in a car crash on 24 November 2008. She was a passenger. Although she had worn her seat belt, she had a light concussion.

WNBA
Dikaioulaku was selected in the third round of the 2011 WNBA draft (29th overall) by the Los Angeles Sparks. Babkina signed with the Sparks on 19 February 2015.

Achievements
2009 – FIBA Europe Under-20 Championship for Women Bronze medal with Latvia women's national basketball team in Poland.
2009 – 1st place in Latvian woman basketball league with SK Cesis.
2009 – 2nd place in Baltic woman basketball league with SK Cesis.
2008 – 9th place in Beijing Basketball at the Summer Olympics with Latvia women's national basketball team.
2008 – 4th place in FIBA "Diamond Ball" tournament in China.
2008 – Winner of Basketball at the 2008 Summer Olympics – Women's qualification.
2007 – 1st place in Latvian woman basketball league with TTT Riga and "Play-offs" MVP.
2005 – FIBA Europe Under-20 Championship for Women Bronze medal with Latvia women's national basketball team in Czech Republic.

References

External links
Elina Babkina at FIBA Europe

1989 births
Living people
Basketball players at the 2008 Summer Olympics
Club Sportiv Municipal Târgoviște players
Latvian expatriate basketball people in Russia
Fenerbahçe women's basketball players
Latvian expatriate basketball people in Poland
Latvian expatriate basketball people in Spain
Latvian expatriate basketball people in Turkey
Latvian expatriate basketball people in Croatia
Latvian expatriate basketball people in the Czech Republic
Latvian expatriate basketball people in Hungary
Latvian expatriate basketball people in Romania
Latvian women's basketball players
Los Angeles Sparks draft picks
Olympic basketball players of Latvia
Point guards
Basketball players from Riga